Olivia P Porter (born 14 November 2001) is an Australian cricketer who plays for the ACT Meteors in the Women's National Cricket League (WNCL) and the Sydney Thunder in the Women's Big Bash League (WBBL). An all-rounder, she bowls right-arm medium pace and bats right-handed.

Porter was signed by the Thunder ahead of the 2020–21 WBBL but was subsequently ruled out of the tournament due to a leg injury. However, she made her Meteors debut on 30 January 2021 in a 2020–21 WNCL match against Queensland Fire. She played six matches in the tournament, scoring 39 runs and taking one wicket.

References

External links

2001 births
Living people
Place of birth missing (living people)
Australian women cricketers
ACT Meteors cricketers
Sydney Thunder (WBBL) cricketers